The Royal Order of Sports Merit is a Spanish civil order of merit established in 18 June 1982. The order is indented to recognise distinguished service in sports, in teaching physical education, or the management, organisation, promotion and development of physical education and sports. The order may be presented to individuals in one of four classes. It may also be presented to legal personalities, organizations, and other entities in one of three classes.

The Spanish Constitution of 1978 contains in article 43.3, a guiding principle in the conduct of public authorities to promote physical education and sport. The Royal Order of Sports Merit is a tool of this constitutional mandate to promote, advertise, and propagate physical culture and sports.

Classes of the order
Individuals may be awarded the Royal Order of Sports Merit in one of four classes: 
Grand Cross, awarded by Royal Decree in accordance with the Council of Ministers.
Gold Medal, awarded by the Minister of Education, Culture and Sport, on the proposal of the President of the Sports Council.
Silver Medal, awarded by the President of the Sports Council.
Bronze Medal, awarded by the President of the Sports Council.

Groups and organizations may be awarded in one of three different classes:
Gold Plaque, awarded by Royal Decree in accordance with the Council of Ministers.
Silver Plaque, awarded by the President of the Sports Council.
Bronze Plaque, awarded by the President of the Sports Council.

References

External links
Ordinances of the Royal Order of Sports Merit, BOE.es

Sport
Spanish sports trophies and awards